Cerisy-Buleux is a commune in the Somme department in Hauts-de-France in northern France.

Geography

Population

Places of interest
 The old railway line:
The railway, opened in 1872, was closed on 10 November 1993. Mostly freight trains for the many farming cooperatives, there were also a few passenger trains.

Personality
 Jean Tagault (circa 1499–1546), anatomist and surgeon.

See also
Communes of the Somme department
Réseau des Bains de Mer

References

External links

 The old railway 

Communes of Somme (department)